Skilpadshek (Afrikaans for tortoise gate) is a border checkpoint on the South African border with Botswana, located  north-west of Zeerust in North West province. The corresponding checkpoint on the Botswana side of the border is called Pioneer Gate. The Trans-Kalahari Corridor passes through Skilpadshek, and it is the western end of the N4 road (Platinum Highway), which continues in Botswana as the A2.

See also
 List of Botswana–South Africa border crossings

References

Populated places in the Ramotshere Moiloa Local Municipality
Botswana–South Africa border crossings